Diankabou (Jàkáw) is a village and commune and seat of the Cercle of Koro in the Mopti Region of Mali. In 1998 the commune had a population of 14,760.

Diankabou is a large village situated in the in plains between Bamba and Madougou. The village has large ponds with water lilies. Jamsay Dogon is spoken in Diankabou. A weekly Friday market is held in the village. Local surnames are Pudiougo, Guindo, Dara, and Teli.

References

Communes of Mopti Region